Biren Sikder (born 16 October 1949) is a Bangladesh Awami League politician and the incumbent Jatiya Sangsad member representing the Magura-2 constituency. He served as the State Minister for Youth and Sports during 2014–2019.

Early life 
Sikder was born on 16 October 1949. He completed his education under the Jessore Education Board. He completed his B.A. and M.A. from the University of Rajshahi.

Career 
From 1968 to 1969, Sikder served as the president of greater Jessore district unit of Bangladesh Chhatra League. In 1985, he was elected chairman of Shalikha Upazila. He was elected to the parliament four times. He was a member of the Parliamentary Standing Committee on the Ministry of Commerce and the Parliamentary Standing Committee on the Education. He  was the chairman of the Parliamentary Standing Committee of Textile and Jute Ministry.

Sikder was elected to Parliament from Magura-2 as a candidate of Bangladesh Awami League.

References

Living people
1949 births
People from Magura District
Bangladeshi Hindus
Awami League politicians
7th Jatiya Sangsad members
9th Jatiya Sangsad members
10th Jatiya Sangsad members
11th Jatiya Sangsad members
State Ministers of Youth and Sports (Bangladesh)